Alan Ming-ta Wu was a Taiwanese-American molecular biologist and immunologist who developed techniques to grow hematopoetic stem cells in cell culture.

Early life 
Wu was born in Tainan, Taiwan and attended Chang Jung Senior High School in Tainan. He obtained his medical degree from National Taiwan University Medical School and served for two years as an army medical officer.

Research 
Wu conducted research for his PhD in medical biophysics with Till & McCulloch at the Ontario Cancer Institute in Toronto. Wu's PhD work demonstrated the relation between bone marrow and T cells. He was the first to grow stem cells (then called colony forming cells) in cell culture. This allowed Wu to transplant a single cell that generated the entire hematopoetic system in a mouse.

Following his PhD, Wu joined Harrison Echols' lab in the US, performing pioneering work on the regulation of viral genes. They probed the mechanism whereby the cI protein of phage λ represses expression of viral genes through interactions with host RNA polymerase.

In 1971, Wu obtained a position as Senior Scientist at the NIH in Bethesda, Maryland. He collaborated with Bob Gallo on studying how oncogenic viruses replicate, which included studies of reverse transcriptase. Wu applied this knowledge to probe the effects of drugs on mouse tumours induced by oncogenic viruses. He became director of molecular biology at cancer research firm Litton Bionetics Inc.

Wu returned to Toronto in 1976 to take up a position as an Associate Professor of Anatomy. His lab developed techniques for the long-term culture of human T cell progenitors, enabling detailed analysis of T cell biology. 

The Institute of Medical Sciences at University of Toronto presents their annual Alan Wu Poster Prize to the most outstanding poster presentations at IMS Scientific Day. This award in honour of Wu notes that "He was well recognized for his research excellence, his passion for science and his strong belief in the value of translational medicine."

Personal Details 
Wu married Gillian Edwards, a fellow graduate student. They have two sons, Tim Wu and David Wu. 

Wu was active in the Taiwan independence movement.

Wu was an avid runner, completing ten marathons in the five years before his death.

Wu passed away from a brain tumour in 1981.

References 

1981 deaths
University of Toronto alumni
Academic staff of the University of Toronto
American academics of Taiwanese descent
American medical researchers
Molecular biologists
National Taiwan University alumni